Art and Life is the twelfth studio album by dancehall deejay Beenie Man, released on July 11, 2000. He garnered commercial success in the States with this album, with the help of the reggae fusion hit single "Girls dem Sugar". It marked one of the first successful reggae fusion albums from a dancehall artist.

It received the Grammy Award for Best Reggae Album in 2001. It sold more than 400,000 copies.

Critical reception

Art and Life received mostly positive reviews from music critics. At Metacritic, which assigns a normalized rating out of 100 to reviews from mainstream critics, the album received an average score of 77, which indicates "generally favorable reviews", based on 8 reviews.

Track listing
Credits adapted from the album's liner notes.

Charts

References

Beenie Man albums
2000 albums
Albums produced by Salaam Remi
Albums produced by the Neptunes
Grammy Award for Best Reggae Album